The 2003 National Lacrosse League season is the 17th season in the NLL that began on December 27, 2002, and concluded with the championship game on May 3, 2003.

In 2003, the NLL became the first major men's sports league in North America to feature a woman playing in a regular-season game. Ginny Capicchioni, a stand-out goaltender at Sacred Heart University, was signed by the New Jersey Storm as their third-string goaltender. She dressed for three games, though only played in one. Capicchioni collected one loose ball and made six saves while allowing 7 goals in 11 minutes of play.

Team movement
2003 saw the Montreal Express suspend operations, and also saw the Washington Power move to Colorado, where even they were unprepared for the warm welcome they received in Denver. The franchise had drawn small crowds in Washington as well as in Pittsburgh and Baltimore before that, but averaged more than 16,000 fans per game in 2003, second in the league only to Toronto.

Milestones
January 31: John Tavares became the 3rd player in NLL history (after Gary and Paul Gait) with 400 career goals, scoring 5 and adding 6 assists as the Buffalo Bandits defeated the Columbus Landsharks 19–16

Final standings

Regular season

Playoffs

Semifinals
Colorado 11 @ Toronto 15
Buffalo 13 @ Rochester 16

Championship
Toronto 8 @ Rochester 6

All Star Game
No NLL All-Star game was held in 2003.

Awards

Weekly awards
The NLL gives out awards weekly for the best overall player, best offensive player, best defensive player, and best rookie.

Monthly awards 
Awards are also given out monthly for the best overall player and best rookie.

Statistics leaders
Bold numbers indicate new single-season records. Italics indicate tied single-season records.

See also 
 2003 in sports

References

External links
 2003 Archive at the Outsider's Guide to the NLL

03
National Lacrosse League